Amongst Men is a four-part Argentine crime thriller television miniseries based on the eponymous novel by Germán Maggiori. It was released on HBO Max on 26 September 2021.

Premise 
The fiction is set in the fringes of the Province of Buenos Aires towards 1996. In the wake of the death of a woman during an orgy because of overdose, the VHS recording the party becomes a macguffin in the plot, which explores the Argentine criminal gangs and their relation with the police.

Cast

Production and release 
The series is based on the novel of the same name by Germán Maggiori, first published in 2001. Produced by HBO Latin America and Pol-ka Producciones, shooting began in June 2019. Pablo Fendrik directed the episodes. The series was pre-screened on 2 March 2021 at the 71st Berlin International Film Festival. Consisting of fourt parts featuring a runtime of about an hour each, Amongst Men debuted on HBO Max on 26 September 2021.

References

External links

HBO Max original programming
Television series based on novels
2021 Argentine television series debuts
2021 Argentine television series endings
2020s drama television series
Argentine crime television series
Argentine television miniseries
Spanish-language television shows
Television shows set in Argentina
Television series set in 1996